A cream horn is a pastry made with flaky or puff pastry, and whipped cream. (An alternative version, the meringue horn, is made with meringue.)

The horn shape is made by winding overlapping pastry strips around a conical mould. After baking, a spoonful of jam or fruit is added and the pastry is then filled with whipped cream. The pastry can also be moistened and sprinkled with sugar before baking for a sweeter, crisp finish. 

Creams horns are called cannoncini in Italy, kornedákia in Greece and Schaumrollen in Austria. In Pittsburgh, Pennsylvania, cream horns are called Lady Locks or clothespin cookies.

See also

 List of pastries
 Torpil
 Trubochki

References

External links

Pastries
Stuffed desserts